Between Limoges, Brive and Périgueux, the viscounts of Limoges, also called viscounts of Ségur created a small principality, whose last heir was Henry IV. Ségur was the main home of these viscounts, in the heart of their domain. The viscounty went from the Limoges-Ségur family to the House of Montfort in Brittany, then to the Albrets and eventually to the Bourbons.

Territory
Their territory included the castles of Ségur, Excideuil, Aixe-su-Vienne, Auberoche and Nontron.

Ségur Castle
Built in a shingle of the Auvézère River, at the borders of Saint-Eloi, Saint Julien, Payzac and Beyssenac parishes, the place is naturally defensive. The Ségur  (headquarters of the castle garrison) was home to the Pérusse family (future dukes of the Cars), Bonneval family (future marquises of Bonneval; Claude Alexandre de Bonneval became a famous Ottoman Empire pasha), and Prévot family (later du Mas family, future marquises of Paysac).

The upper castle is in ruins.
There are no tours .

Excideuil Castle
Only two large towers remain, joined together by a screen wall that used to be the aula pinion. The main home (16th or 17th century?) was doubled in width at the beginning of the 20th century.
The outward gate of the castle garrison's  is a Renaissance door.

Aixe Castle
A Merovingian  was recorded as being at the confluence of the river. The  (or Jeanne d'Albret Tower) was constructed in the 13th century in Aixe-sur-Vienne, controlled by the viscounts of Limoges. It was demolished at the beginning of the 19th century.

Thiviers Castle

Auberoche Castle
Probably around 1037 or 1059, the successor of Bishop Frotaire (the  founder) is said to have given  to the Viscount of Limoges, in order to get the protection of this secular lord against the Count of Périgord.

The Viscount of Limoges acknowledged the bishop of Périgueux as his suzerain, in relation to Auberoche, as early as the last third of the 12th century (1154–1157). By this submission, the viscount extended his domination up to the Périgord episcopal and county headquarters gates. Therefore, the viscounts of Limoges could maintain and use their political and economic power at the gates of Périgueux. The castle became a chaplain center which included 16 parishes (in 1365) and controlled two main, convergent traffic streams towards Périgueux city, through the Auvézère and Manoir valleys.

Confirmed as soon as September 1257, the judicial and administrative power was enforced in the whole district area by a provost, the agent of the viscount of Limoges.

References

History of Limousin
Limoges